Michael C. Keith (born 1945 in Albany, New York) is an American media historian and author. He has served as a faculty member of the Boston College Communication Department  since 1993 and is the author of some two dozen books on media. He is one of the country's foremost authorities on the social impact and role of radio in American culture. He has lectured in Russia, Spain, Tanzania, and at several institutions in the U.S. and Canada. He was appointed emeritus professor in 2017 upon retiring from Boston College.

Keith served as a visiting professor at George Washington University and Marquette University and Director of Telecommunications at Dean College.  He frequently appears in both American and foreign media as an authority on electronic media. Prior to becoming a full-time academic in the late 1970s, he worked as a broadcast professional for more than a decade.

Keith's substantial published output melds his own experience, a network of contacts in and beyond the radio business, and careful research, to produce solid analysis of what a growing number of people in and out of the industry see as the growing crisis of broadcast radio.

A number of his books have been co-authored with Robert Hilliard, now retired from Emerson College.  The team usually works with Keith conceiving the topic and doing much of the initial legwork research and Hilliard taking on the initial book manuscript draft. They both work on the final version. Their co-authored works, and those of Keith alone, often tackle controversial topics such as the demise of local radio programming (2005); the legal intricacies of indecent or even obscene programming (2003); the use of radio by extreme hate groups (1999), a title on President Clinton's summer reading list one year; and the use of radio by Native Americans (1995), the first monograph to appear on that topic.

Keith has been a Stanton Fellow of the International Radio & Television Society and received the Distinguished Scholar Award given by the Broadcast Education Association and the Achievement Award in the Humanities by the University of Rhode Island.

In addition to his many media books and academic articles, Keith has written a well-reviewed memoir of his unconventional childhood years — The Next Better Place (Algonquin Books, 2003) — as well as a coming of age novel, Life is Falling Sideways (Parlance, 2009).  He has written an ever-expanding list of short stories, which have appeared in numerous online and print journals, such as The Literati Quarterly, The Penmen Review, Lowestoft Chronicle, "Grey Sparrow Journal," and several annual anthologies. Collections of his stories are available in paperback editions and in ebook formats; these include Hoag's Object (Whiskey Creek Press), And Through the Trembling Air and Of Night and Light (Blue Mustang Press), Sad Boy (Big Table Publishing), Everything is Epic (Silver Birch Press), The Collector of Tears (Underground Voices), If Things Were Made To Last Forever (Big Table Publishing), Caricatures (Strange Days Books), The Near Enough (Cold River Press), Bits, Specks, Crumbs, Flecks (Vraeyda Literary), Slow Transit (Cervena Barva Press), Perspective Drifts Like a Log on a River (PalmArtPress), Let Us Now Speak of Extinction (Mad Hat Press), Stories in the Key of Me (Regal House Publishing), "Insomnia 11" (Mad Hat Press),"Leaning West" (Cervena Barva Press), "Pieces of Bones and Rags" (Cabal Books), "Quiet Geography" (Cervena Barva Press), The Late Epiphany of a Low Key Oracle (Scantic Books), and "Bodies in Recline" (Pelekinesis). His fiction has been nominated for the Pushcart Prize and Pen/O.Henry Award, among others. His work has been translated in Greece, Albania, Russia, Indonesia, Spain, and China.

Work 
 (See above).
Bits Specks Crumbs Flecks short story collection, Vraeyda Media, 2015
"Scar", short story at Blue Lake Review, May 2011
 Norman Corwin’s ‘One World Flight:’ The Lost Journal of Radio’s Greatest Writer (with Mary Ann Watson), Continuum, 2009
 The Radio Station, 8th ed. Boston: Focal Press, 2009
 Sounds of Change: FM Broadcasting in America (with Christopher H. Sterling), University of North Carolina Press, 2008
 Radio Cultures: The Sound Medium in American Life (editor), Peter Lang, 2008
 The Quieted Voice: The Rise and Demise of Localism in American Radio (with Robert Hilliard), Southern Illinois University Press, 2005
 The Broadcast Century and Beyond: A Biography of American Broadcasting, 4th ed. (with Robert Hilliard) Focal Press, 2005

 Dirty Discourse: Sex and Indecency in American Radio (with Robert Hilliard),  Blackwell Publishing, 2003.  
 Sounds In the Dark: All Night Radio in American Life, Iowa State University Press, 2001
 Queer Airwaves: Gay and Lesbian Broadcasting in America (with Phylis Johnson), M.E. Sharpe, 2001.
 Talking Radio:  An Oral History of American Radio in the Television Age, M.E. Sharpe, 2000
 Waves of Rancor: Tuning in the Radical Right (with Robert Hilliard), M.E. Sharpe, 1999 
 The Hidden Screen (with Robert Hilliard), Focal, 1999 
 Voices In the Purple Haze: Underground Radio and the Sixties, Praeger, 1997
 Global Broadcasting Systems (with Robert Hilliard), Focal, 1996 
 Signals In the Air: Native Broadcasting In America, Praeger, 1995
 Selling Radio Direct (with Robert Hilliard), Broadcasting, 1992 
 Radio Production: Art and Science, Focal, 1990
 Broadcast Voice Performance, Focal, 1989
 Radio Programming: Consultancy and Formatics, Focal, 1987
 Production in Format Radio Handbook, University Press of America, 1984

References

 Steffens, Daneet (January 24, 2003), Entertainment Weekly
 Cox, Christopher (January 27, 2003), Boston Herald 
 Campbell, Bill (January 26, 2003), Milwaukee Journal Sentinel
 Connors, Philip (January 12, 2003), Newsday
 Litchfield, Nicholas (2014), Somewhere Sometime... 
 Kranendonk, Kellee (December, 2011), Silver Pen Writer's Association
 Pierce, Charles P. (July 18, 2004), Boston Globe Magazine

External links
 Official website

1945 births
Living people
American non-fiction writers
People from Albany, New York
Media historians
Boston College faculty
George Washington University faculty
Marquette University faculty